Angoshtjan (also Romanized as Angoshtjān and Angoshtejān; also known as Angeshtavān, Angestevān, Angistavan, and Angoshtevān) is a village in Chehregan Rural District, Tasuj District, Shabestar County, East Azerbaijan Province, Iran. At the 2006 census, its population was 213, in 53 families.

References 

Populated places in Shabestar County